Mohamed Ramadan Mohamed Eliwa (born 23 August 1986, Alexandria) is an Egyptian boxer. At the 2012 Summer Olympics, he competed in the Men's lightweight, but was defeated in the first round.

References

Living people
Olympic boxers of Egypt
Boxers at the 2012 Summer Olympics
Lightweight boxers
Egyptian male boxers
1986 births
Sportspeople from Alexandria
Mediterranean Games bronze medalists for Egypt
Mediterranean Games medalists in boxing
Competitors at the 2005 Mediterranean Games
Competitors at the 2013 Mediterranean Games
20th-century Egyptian people
21st-century Egyptian people